Kronin  (1897 - 1945 Krönau; known from 1945 to 1950 in Polish as Kronowo) is a village in the administrative district of Gmina Pasłęk, within Elbląg County, Warmian-Masurian Voivodeship, in northern Poland.

The village has a population of 120.

References

Kronin